¡Qué Chulada! is a Mexican talk show produced and broadcast by Imagen Televisión. It is a space for conversation on current issues of general interest, where women can raise their voices, offer their point of view and set their own style to question, reflect, entertain and share with the audience.

It is broadcast live from the studios of Ciudad Imagen on Av. Copilco, Coyoacán in Mexico City, Mexico. It premiered on February 24, 2020 and is hosted by Verónica Toussaint, Marta Guzmán (salio), Mariana H and Annie Barrios , with Luz María Zetina (salio), Mónica Noguera and Paulina Mercado (salio). It currently airs Monday through Friday from 12:30 p.m. to 14:00 p.m (UTC).

Presenters

Hosting
 Verónica Toussaint (2020–present) 
 Mariana H(2020–present)
 Annie Barrios (2021–present)

Colaboradores

 Mónica Noguera (2020–present)
 Marlene Stahl (2021–Present)
 Lalo Carrillo (2020–present)

Segments 
Ya en serio: In this section the hosts will touch on various topics of depth.
Preguntas con huevos: Several questions found inside egg-shaped containers will be answered.
Yo nunca, nunca: The hosts will tell the truth about what they have experienced, or not, to seek empathy with the audience.
Con sentido: It is an interview section, based on the parts of the human body.
El clóset: Intimate confessions are made in order to bring out fears and confront them with the viewers.

References

External links
Official website at Imagen Televisión

2020 Mexican television series debuts
2020s Mexican television series
Imagen Televisión original programming
Live television series
Mexican television news shows
Spanish-language television shows